"Long Tall Sally", also known as "Long Tall Sally (The Thing)", is a rock and roll song written by Robert "Bumps" Blackwell, Enotris Johnson, and Little Richard. Richard recorded it for Specialty Records, which released it as a single in March 1956, backed with "Slippin' and Slidin'.

The single reached number one on the Billboard rhythm and blues chart, staying at the top for six of 19 weeks, while peaking at number six on the pop chart. It received the Cash Box Triple Crown Award in 1956. The song as sung by Little Richard is listed at number 55 on Rolling Stones list of The 500 Greatest Songs of All Time. It also ranked at number 45 on Billboards year-end singles of 1956.

It became one of the singer's best-known hits and has become a rock and roll standard covered by hundreds of artists, including Elvis Presley, Fleetwood Mac, the Kinks and the Beatles.

History
"Tutti Frutti" was a big hit for Little Richard and Specialty in early 1956, reaching number two in the R&B charts. Pat Boone's cover version of the song reached number 12 in the pop charts. Although this meant an unexpected cash income for the Specialty publishing firm, A&R man and producer "Bumps" Blackwell and a proud Richard decided to write a song that was so up-tempo and the lyrics so fast that Boone would not be able to handle it. (Boone eventually did record his own version, however, which reached number 18.)

According to Blackwell, he was introduced to a little girl by Honey Chile, a popular disc-jockey. The girl had written a song for Little Richard to record so she could pay the treatment for her ailing aunt Mary. The song, actually a few lines on a piece of paper, went like this:

Not wishing to upset an influential disc-jockey, Blackwell accepted the offer and took the idea to Richard, who was reluctant at first. Nevertheless, the line "ducked back in the alley" was exactly what they were looking for, and Richard kept practicing until he could sing it as fast as possible. They worked on the song, adding verses and a chorus, until they got the hit they wanted. Enotris Johnson (1935–2015) was a local songwriter; her involvement in writing the song, and others, was uncertain until it was confirmed by her family after her death.   Featuring a tenor saxophone solo by Lee Allen (as did "Tutti Frutti"), "Long Tall Sally" was the best-selling 45 of the history of Specialty Records.

Recording
The recording session took place on February 7, 1956, at J&M Studio in New Orleans, owned by Cosimo Matassa on the corner of Rampart and Dumaine where Fats Domino and many other New Orleans luminaries recorded. "Long Tall Sally", as well as many other Little Richard sides, was also recorded there.

The music was a fast uptempo number with Little Richard's hammering, boogie piano. Richard plays staccato straight eighth notes while drummer Palmer plays a fast shuffle. The shuffle was the most common rhythm and blues beat; Richard added the straight eighth notes, much less common in that time, although now standard for rock music. Together this created an ambiguity in the ride rhythm—known to musicians as "playing in the crack" that came to characterize New Orleans (and also Chuck Berry) rock and roll. In typical Little Richard style, he sang in the key of F, in a raw, aggressive, exhilarating style with lyrics being about self-centered fun.

Personnel 
According to Chris Morris' liner notes to the 2017 reissue of Here's Little Richard:

Little Richard vocals, piano
Lee Allen tenor saxophone
Edgar Blanchard guitar
Frank Fields double bass
Earl Palmer drums
Alvin "Red" Tyler baritone saxophone

The Kinks version

Background
The Kinks started performing in early 1963 under various names, including the Ravens which would be what they would be called for most of that year. Their members at the time consisted of Ray Davies, Dave Davies, Pete Quaife and Mickey Willet. Looking to branch out, the Kinks sought out a manager, and after a few unsuccessful meetings, they met Larry Page, who promised the group a certain degree of fame. Page introduced the Ravens to American record producer Shel Talmy along with the Beatles' promoter, Arthur Howes, who was their tour manager. Talmy managed to secure the group a recording contract with Pye Records, who he previously had been collaborating with. Shortly before signing, Willet left the group, upon which they hired drummer Mick Avory who had placed an ad in Melody Maker.

Towards the end of 1963, the Ravens also decided to change their name, becoming the Kinks instead. Unsure of what material they should record as their debut single, Howes suggested to Page that they should record "Long Tall Sally". Howes had heard the Beatles perform the track in Paris on January 16 and noted the audience reaction, which was frantic and in a frenzy. However, as the Beatles only performed the track live (and would not record it in the studio for another three months), Howes and Page both noted the commercial opportunity of putting the song on record before the Beatles had time to do so. Page quickly instructed the band to learn the track and only four days later, the group together with Talmy entered Pye Studios for the first time. They recorded five songs that session; "Long Tall Sally", "I Took My Baby Home", "You Still Want Me", "You Do Something To Me" and "I Don't Need You Anymore. Talmy was not too keen on Avory drumming, as he was new in the group, instead opting for session musician Bobby Graham.

Release and reception
The Kinks' version was a modernized arrangement of the song, omitting the frantic piano found in the original, along with moving away from R&B towards a contemporary rock sound. The rhythm of the Kinks rendition also changes, instead being more similar to Little Richard's later hit "Lucille". Unlike other versions, it features a "wailing harmonica solo" played by Ray. Rob Jovanovic writes that their arrangement is similar to the Beatles version, right down to a couple of phrasings in some verses. However, Thomas Kitts states that the merseybeat rendition "zapped energy" from the record and that the Kinks "lacked the necessary fire or punch to conquer both Little Richard and Paul McCartney". Kitts believes that Dave should have taken the lead vocals as his voice was more "gritty".

The Kinks version would eventually be released through Pye Records on February 7, 1964, in the UK and later on Cameo Records in the US on April 1, 1964. The B-side was the Ray Davies original "I Took My Baby Home", which was a "beat-driven rhythm and blues" number. Though Page "aggressively" advertised and promoted "Long Tall Sally" in the media, it would fail to reach the Record Retailer charts. It did, however, reach number 42 for a week in Melody Maker's Pop 30, giving the Kinks their first commercial success. Following their breakthrough in America, "Long Tall Sally" managed to reach the Billboard Bubbling Under Hot 100 chart in January 1965, staying there for two weeks and peaking at number 129.

In Disc magazine, Don Nicholl gave the single three out of five stars. He writes that despite the Kinks "dress to fit the title", they play "in the most conventional rock fashion, I'm afraid". He states that he prefers Little Richard's original and calls "I Took My Baby Home" a better song. In Record Mirror, "Long Tall Sally" is described as "pounding stuff" and is considered a very commercial version of the song.

Personnel

According to band researcher Doug Hinman:

The Kinks
 Ray Davies lead vocal, rhythm guitar, harmonica
 Dave Davies backing vocal, lead guitar
 Pete Quaife backing vocal, bass

Additional musician
 Bobby Graham drum

Charts

The Beatles version 

The Beatles were admirers of Little Richard, and regularly performed his songs during their live act. "Long Tall Sally" was the most durable song in their live repertoire, lasting from their earliest days as the Quarrymen in 1957 through to their last public concert in August 1966. As with the majority of their Little Richard remakes, Paul McCartney sang lead vocals, as he could closely imitate Richard's vocal style.

The group recorded "Long Tall Sally" at EMI Studios in London on March 1, 1964, during sessions for A Hard Day's Night, although it was ultimately not included on that album. The recording was produced by the Beatles' regular producer, George Martin, who also played piano on the track. Given the group's familiarity with the song, the recording was completed in a single take.

In the United Kingdom, "Long Tall Sally" was released on the UK EP of the same name on June 19, 1964, but it had been released earlier on two overseas albums, The Beatles' Second Album in the United States on April 10, 1964, and The Beatles' Long Tall Sally in Canada on May 11, 1964. Released as a single in Sweden, the song reached number two on Tio i Topp in June and topped the Kvällstoppen Chart in July and August. It also reached number one in Denmark. On March 7, 1988, the song appeared on Past Masters, a compilation album that compiles every song commercially released by the band that was neither included on the 12 UK studio albums nor the US Magical Mystery Tour LP, making it appear for the first time to be included on a core catalogue album.

The song appears in the film Backbeat. Upon viewing it, Paul McCartney was reported to say:

Other Beatles recordings and performances
In addition to their studio recording of the song, the Beatles recorded "Long Tall Sally" for BBC radio broadcasts on seven occasions during 1963 and 1964. Two of those versions have been officially released, on the compilation albums Live at the BBC (1994) and On Air – Live at the BBC Volume 2 (2013). In addition, a studio version, prerecorded specially from the 1964 television special Around the Beatles, was included on the Anthology 1 compilation (1995). The live album The Beatles at the Hollywood Bowl (1977) includes a 1964 concert recording of the song.

"Long Tall Sally" was the last song the Beatles performed live in front of a paying audience. It was a frequent set closer during their 1966 tour—which would turn out to be their last—and they used it to close out their final show at San Francisco's Candlestick Park on August 29, 1966. The band asked their press officer, Tony Barrow, to make an audio tape recording of the concert for posterity. The recording has since circulated heavily among bootleggers, but the 30-minute tape ran out at the end of the second verse of "Long Tall Sally", meaning that the last moments of the Beatles' final live show are lost to history.

Personnel
According to Ian MacDonald, except where noted:

The Beatles
 Paul McCartney vocal, bass
 John Lennon rhythm guitar, guitar solo (first)
 George Harrison lead guitar, guitar solo (second)
 Ringo Starr drums

Additional musician
 George Martin piano

Notes

Sources 

 
 
 
 
 
 
 
 
 
 
 
 

1956 singles
Little Richard songs
The Beatles songs
1964 debut singles
The Kinks songs
Elvis Presley songs
Pat Boone songs
Jerry Lee Lewis songs
Eddie Cochran songs
Buzz Clifford songs
Grammy Hall of Fame Award recipients
Songs written by Robert Blackwell
Songs written by Little Richard
Song recordings produced by George Martin
Song recordings produced by Robert Blackwell
Song recordings produced by Shel Talmy
Specialty Records singles
1956 songs